The 2020 season was Remo's 106th existence. This season Remo participated in the Campeonato Brasileiro Série C, the Campeonato Paraense, the Copa Verde and the Copa do Brasil.

On 15 March 2020, CBF suspended their tournaments indefinitely due to the coronavirus pandemic in Brazil. Eventually on 19 March, the Federação Paraense de Futebol also decided to suspend the Campeonato Paraense.

On 1 July, Campeonato Paraense clubs including Remo made a return to non-contact training, with social distancing rules still in place. The Federação Paraense de Futebol then confirmed a return behind closed doors on 1 August.

Remo finished Campeonato Brasileiro Série C with the runner-up, after losing to Vila Nova by 8–3 in the aggregate, however, he got promoted to Campeonato Brasileiro Série B after 13 years since his last participation in the second national division. The club finished in the 2nd place of the Campeonato Paraense. In the Copa Verde, the club was runner-up after losing the finals by Brasiliense after tied 3–3 on aggregate but lose on penalties by 5–4. In the Copa do Brasil, Remo was eliminated in the second round by Brusque.

Players

Squad information
Numbers in parentheses denote appearances as substitute.

Top scorers

Disciplinary record

Kit
Supplier: Kappa / Main sponsor: Banpará

Transfers

Transfers in

Transfers out

Notes

Competitions

Campeonato Brasileiro Série C

First stage

Matches

Second stage

Matches

Finals

Campeonato Paraense

Group stage

Matches

Final stage

Semi-finals

Finals

Copa Verde

Round of 16

Quarter-finals

Semi-finals

Finals

Copa do Brasil

First round

Second round

References

External links
Official Site 
Remo 100% 

2020 season
Clube do Remo seasons
2020 in Brazilian football